Halys may refer to:

 Health-adjusted life years (HALYs), a type of disability-adjusted life year which are used in attempts to quantify the burden of disease or disability in populations
 Halys River, a western name for the Kızılırmak River (Turkish: "Red River") in Anatolia
 Halys (bug), a genus of stink bugs
 A taxonomic synonym for the genus Gloydius, also known as Asian moccasin snakes, a group of venomous pitvipers found in Asia
Gloydius halys, also known by the names Halys viper and Halys pit viper
 Quentin Halys (born 1996), French tennis player

See also
 Quentin Halys (born 1996), French tennis player
 Battle of Halys, 82 BC
 Battle of the Eclipse (also Battle of Halys) between the Medes and the Lydians in the early 6th century BC
 Halley's Bible Handbook by Dr. Henry Hampton Halley (1824-1965), a.k.a. 'Halley's'